Aubach is a river of Hesse, Germany. It is a tributary of the Aar near Aarbergen.

See also
List of rivers of Hesse

References

Rivers of Hesse
Rivers of the Taunus
Rivers of Germany